Taisia Stadnichenko (Taisiya Maximovna Stadnichenko; 9 October 1894 – 26 November 1958), a Russian born geologist and chemist, whose fieldwork focused on the distribution of germanium and the minor-element content in coal.

Biography 
She was born in Taganash, Perekopsky Uyezd, Crimea on October 9, 1894 and died on November 26, 1958 at the age of sixty-four due to a heart ailment.  

She attended Petrograd University and joined the Russian Geological Survey before moving to the United States in 1918 to act as an interpreter for the Russian mission throughout World War I. 

After the war, she continued her professional life as a researcher at the University of Illinois and as a professor at Vassar College from 1922 to 1935. 

In 1935, Stadnichenko led the first U.S Geological Survey exploring the minor-element distribution within coal by collecting samples of coal ash for element content analysis, which found germanium and other elements within the coal ash. Stadnichenko is widely considered instrumental in the discovery and understanding of coal's structure and origin.

References

1894 births
1958 deaths
Russian geologists
People from Dzhankoy Raion
Saint Petersburg State University alumni
Vassar College faculty
United States Geological Survey personnel
20th-century American geologists
White Russian emigrants to the United States